The College of Staten Island (CSI) is a public university in Staten Island, New York. It is one of the 11 four-year senior colleges within the City University of New York system. Programs in the liberal arts and sciences and professional studies lead to bachelor's and associate degrees. The master's degree is awarded in 13 professional and liberal arts and sciences fields of study. A clinical doctorate is awarded by the department of physical therapy. The college participates in doctoral programs of the CUNY Graduate Center in biochemistry, biology, chemistry, computer science, nursing, physics, and psychology.

History
The College of Staten Island is the product of a merger in 1976 of Staten Island Community College (SICC), founded in 1956, and Richmond College, founded in 1965. Richmond College had been threatened with closure because of New York City's financial crisis, while SICC, because of its status as a community college, received state support. The merger was particularly logical since the community college offered two-year degrees, while Richmond College was an "upper divisional" college (the third in the nation) that offered degrees to those in their third and fourth years of schooling.

The College of Staten Island has been located on the grounds of the former Willowbrook State School since 1993. It is the largest campus, in terms of physical size, in New York City. Before the relocation to Willowbrook, the college had a split campus, located at the former Staten Island Community College (in Sunnyside, on Todt Hill; the campus now houses the Michael J. Petrides School) and Richmond College (in St. George).

Presidents
 Walter L. Willig, 1955–1968, was the inaugural president of College of Staten Island predecessor institution Staten Island Community College (SICC). His academic area of expertise was civil engineering.
 Herbert Schueler, 1966–1973, was the first president of College of Staten Island predecessor institution Richmond College. His academic specialties were German literature and philosophy.
 William M. Birenbaum, 1968–1976, served as president of College of Staten Island predecessor institution Staten Island Community College (SICC) until the merger of SICC and Richmond College in 1976, which resulted in the formation of the College of Staten Island. His academic focus was access to higher education for all.
 Edmond Volpe, 1976–1994, an American literature scholar, retired in 1994, after having successfully handled the merger of the two colleges and the unification of the two campuses. 
 Marlene Springer, 1994–2007, an English and American literature scholar, under whose leadership the college improved academic standards, introduced several master's programs, raised the level of the faculty, added research institutes, and introduced an Honors College, The Verrazano School, and the CSI High School for International Studies, retired in August 2007
 Tomás D. Morales, 2007–2012; arranged for a free shuttle from the Staten Island Ferry to the Willowbrook campus; announced in May 2012 that he would be leaving to become president of California State University at San Bernardino some months after the faculty senate passed a motion of no confidence 
 William J. Fritz, 2012-2021, geologist, appointed interim president on August 15, 2012, and as president on May 6, 2014

Following the retirement of William J. Fritz on December 31, 2021, Timothy G. Lynch began serving as the college's interim president.

Academics

Research 
CSI has more than 80 science labs which includes the Center for Developmental Neuroscience and The CUNY Interdisciplinary High-Performance Computing Center (HPCC). HPPC is made to advance the university's educational and research mission by providing advanced high-performance computing technology resources and corresponding technical assistance to faculty and students. It is one of the most powerful supercomputers in the region.

Rankings

As of the 2016 school year, U.S. News & World Report has ranked The College of Staten Island between 146th and 187th in their Best Regional Universities in the North category, and tied for 118th in Best Undergraduate Engineering Programs that do not offer a doctorate, yet the college is unranked nationally. For 2018, the Times Higher Education World University Rankings has placed The College of Staten Island between 601st and 800th in their US University Rankings category, while Forbes ranks the college 451st nationally, 152nd in their Public Colleges category, and 164th in the Northeast. Furthermore, Forbes ranks the college 111th in their America's Best Value Colleges. The college is also very research oriented and the High Impact Universities Research Performance Index (RPI) grades CSI with a B for its research performance. Furthermore, the college is ranked 37th nationally in the 2017 SMI Ranking which measures the upward economic mobility.

Athletics
The College of Staten Island athletic teams are known as the Dolphins. The university is a provisional member of the National Collegiate Athletic Association (NCAA) Division II, and set to join the East Coast Conference (ECC) in the 2020–21 academic year. The university previously competed at the Division III level as a member of the City University of New York Athletic Conference (CUNYAC) from 1979–80 to 2019–20. The college began the transition to Division II during the 2019–20 season playing a mixed schedule of Division II and Division III teams, the college. During the following two years of provisional status the Dolphins will compete in the conference and are eligible for conference awards but will not be eligible for ECC and NCAA championships until completing the transition process for the 2022–23 academic year. The men's and women's swimming and diving teams will remain in the Metropolitan Swimming Conference (METS) as the ECC doesn't sponsor the sport. The college competes in 16 sports. Men's sports are baseball, basketball, cross country, soccer, swimming and diving, tennis, and track and field (indoor and outdoor); women's sports are basketball, cross country, soccer, softball, swimming and diving, tennis, and track and field (indoor and outdoor).

Notable people

Faculty/staff

 Nancy Bogen, professor of English, producer of mixed media combining photography, poetry and music
 Patricia J. Brooks, professor of psychology, director of the Language Learning Laboratory
 Jean Halley, professor of sociology, focusing on issues of social power
 Tyehimba Jess, professor of English, recipient of 2017 Pulitzer Prize for Poetry
Cate Marvin, professor of English, writer of poetry and recipient of 2015 Guggenheim Fellowship
 Seth Roland (born 1957), soccer player and coach
 Sarah Schulman, CUNY distinguished professor of the Humanities, novelist, playwright, nonfiction writer, screenwriter and AIDS historian
 Patricia Smith, professor of English, winner of the 2018 NAACP Image Award for Outstanding Literary Work—Poetry
Charles Liu, professor of Astrophysics, former director of the Verrazano School and of the William E. Macaulay Honors College at CSI

Alumni
 Farooque Ahmed, imprisoned for planning to bomb Washington Metro stations
 Joanne Bland, civil rights activist in Alabama
 Justin Brannan, New York City Council since 2018, representing Brooklyn; former musician
 Sara M. Gonzalez, New York City Council 2002–2014, representing Brooklyn
 Vinny Guadagnino, American reality television personality, best known for MTV's Jersey Shore
 Muriel A. Howard, president of Buffalo State College 1996–2009
 Raj Amit Kumar, filmmaker and writer, best known for Unfreedom which is banned in India
 Jeremy Luke, film and television actor
 Bahman Maghsoudlou, filmmaker and film historian, CSI Alumni Hall of Fame
 Michael Mulgrew, fifth President of the United Federation of Teachers
 Joe Rigby, jazz saxophonist, NYC music teacher of the year 1996
 Gene Simmons, co-lead singer and bassist from the band Kiss
 Kevin Sussman, actor in The Big Bang Theory.

References

External links

Official website
Official athletics website

 
Staten Island, College of
Universities and colleges in Staten Island
1976 establishments in New York City